Johannes Wilhelm "Hans" Geiger (30 September 1882 – 24 September 1945) was a German physicist. He is best known as the co-inventor of the detector component of the Geiger counter and for the Geiger–Marsden experiment which discovered the atomic nucleus. He was the brother of meteorologist and climatologist Rudolf Geiger.

Biography
Geiger was born at Neustadt an der Haardt, Germany. He was one of five children born to the Indologist Wilhelm Ludwig Geiger, who was a professor at the University of Erlangen. In 1902, Geiger started studying physics and mathematics at the University of Erlangen and was awarded a doctorate in 1906. His thesis was on electrical discharges through gases. He received a fellowship to the University of Manchester and worked as an assistant to Arthur Schuster. In 1907, after Schuster's retirement, Geiger began to work with his successor, Ernest Rutherford, and in 1908, along with Ernest Marsden, conducted the famous Geiger–Marsden experiment (also known as the "gold foil experiment"). This process allowed them to count alpha particles and led Rutherford to start thinking about the structure of the atom. 

In 1911 Geiger and John Mitchell Nuttall discovered the Geiger–Nuttall law (or rule) and performed experiments that led to Rutherford's atomic model.

In 1912, Geiger was named head of radiation research at the German National Institute of Science and Technology in Berlin. There he worked with Walter Bothe (winner of the 1954 Nobel Prize in Physics) and James Chadwick (winner of the 1935 Nobel Prize in Physics). Work was interrupted when Geiger served in the German military during World War I as an artillery officer from 1914 to 1918.

In 1924, Geiger used his device to confirm the Compton effect which helped earn Arthur Compton the 1927 Nobel Prize in Physics.

In 1925, he began a teaching position at the University of Kiel where, in 1928 Geiger and his student Walther Müller created an improved version of the Geiger tube, the Geiger–Müller tube. This new device not only detected alpha particles, but beta and gamma particles as well, and is the basis for the Geiger counter.

In 1929 Geiger was named professor of physics and director of research at the University of Tübingen where he made his first observations of a cosmic ray shower. In 1936 he took a position with the Technische Universität Berlin (Technical University of Berlin) where he continued to research cosmic rays, nuclear fission, and artificial radiation until his death in 1945.

Beginning in 1939, after the discovery of atomic fission, Geiger was a member of the Uranium Club, the German investigation of nuclear weapons during World War II. The group splintered in 1942 after its members came to believe (incorrectly, as it would later transpire) that nuclear weapons would not play a significant role in ending the war.

Although Geiger signed a petition against the Nazi government's interference with universities, he provided no support to colleague Hans Bethe (winner of the 1967 Nobel Prize in Physics) when he was fired for being Jewish.

Geiger endured the Battle of Berlin and subsequent Soviet occupation in April/May 1945. A couple of months later he moved to Potsdam, dying there two months after the atomic bombings of Hiroshima and Nagasaki in Japan.

See also
Geiger (crater)
Geiger tube telescope

References

External links 

Annotated bibliography for Hans Geiger from the Alsos Digital Library for Nuclear Issues

1882 births
1945 deaths
German nuclear physicists
20th-century German inventors
University of Erlangen-Nuremberg alumni
People associated with the University of Manchester
People from the Palatinate (region)
Academic staff of the Technical University of Berlin
Academic staff of the University of Kiel
People from Neustadt an der Weinstraße
20th-century German physicists